Cameron 'Cammy' Kerr (born 10 September 1995) is a Scottish footballer who plays as a defender for Dundee. He has also had two loan spells with Peterhead.

Career

Dundee
While growing up, Kerr supported Dundee and was a season ticket holder. He went on to sign for Dundee and was included in the first team as an unused substitute on the final day of the SPL season in 2012–13 against Hibernian.

In July 2013, Kerr was included in a number of first-team pre-season matches, where he featured as a right back. The first of those appearances came in a 5–1 win over Montrose, which he described as a "dream". Having been at Dundee for a couple of years, Kerr made his breakthrough into the first team in the 2013–2014 season, on 11 January 2014, appearing as a second-half substitute against Livingston. He made his first start on 12 April 2014, as Dundee beat Cowdenbeath. Kerr said making his first start was a great experience, adding that the win made it better. He went on to make two more appearances for Dundee, both as starts, to fill in for the suspended Gary Irvine. The club went on to win the Scottish Championship earning promotion to the Scottish Premiership. At the end of the 2013–14 season, Kerr signed a new deal at Dens Park to remain at the club for a further two years.

Kerr made his Scottish Premiership debut, coming on as a substitute for Jim McAlister in the 43rd minute, in a 2–1 loss against Ross County on 27 September 2014. After making another Premiership appearance, he was loaned out to Peterhead on a one-month loan deal on 6 November 2014.

Peterhead (loan)
Kerr made his Peterhead debut on 8 November 2014, in a 1–1 draw against Dunfermline Athletic. He scored his first Peterhead goal on 6 December 2014, in a 3–2 win over Stirling Albion. On 9 January 2015, he extended his loan-spell until the end of the 2014–15 Scottish League One season. Weeks after extending his loan spell with the club, Kerr later added two more goals for the season against Stenhousemuir and Forfar Athletic. Kerr went on to make twenty appearances for the club.

Kerr was again loaned to Peterhead for a four-month spell in August 2015 and made a further 10 appearances in the 2015–16 Scottish League One season.

Return to Dundee
Kerr was recalled from Peterhead early by Dundee in December 2015. He was awarded man-of-the-match in his first Scottish Premiership starting appearance, a Dundee derby victory over Dundee United on 2 January 2016.

Kerr went on to establish himself as a regular starter in the Dundee side. At the end of the 2016–17 season he was awarded the Dundee Player of the Year award alongside picking up the Young Player of the Year trophy for the third time.

At the start of the 2017–18 season Kerr was made vice-captain by manager Neil McCann.

After finding himself in and out of the team during the 2020–21 season, Kerr would be a key figure at both full-back positions as he helped Dundee to win the Premiership play-offs and earn promotion back to the Premiership. At the end of the season, Kerr signed a new two-year deal, entitling him to a testimonial match in the 2022–23 season, having spent ten senior years with Dundee despite being just 27 at season's end.

In July 2022, Kerr scored goals in consecutive games for the first time in his career in the Scottish League Cup for Dundee, already making it his best goalscoring season for The Dark Blues. On 6 January 2023, Kerr was named as captain in his 250th appearance for Dundee.

Career statistics

Honours
Dundee
Scottish Championship: 2013–14
Scottish Premiership play-offs: 2020–21

References

External links
 
 
 Cammy Kerr Profile at Dundee

Dundee F.C. players
Living people
1995 births
Scottish Professional Football League players
Footballers from Dundee
Association football defenders
Peterhead F.C. players
Scottish footballers